The 2010 season is the 7th season of competitive football by University of San Martín de Porres.

Statistics

Appearances and goals

Competition Overload

Copa Sudamericana 2010

Second stage

First stage

Primera División Peruana 2010

Final Nacional

Liguilla Final – Group A

Regular season

Universidad San Martín seasons
2010 in Peruvian football